Chandra is a Hindu lunar deity.

Chandra may also refer to:

People 

 Ambrish Chandra, Canadian engineer
 Ashok K. Chandra, a computer scientist
 Bhagwat Chandrasekhar, a former Indian cricketer
 Bipan Chandra, an Indian historian
 Lokesh Chandra, a Buddhist scholar
 Ranjit Chandra, an Indian-Canadian immunologist accused of academic fraud
 Subrahmanyan Chandrasekhar, an Indian-American astrophysicist who formulated what was later called the Chandrasekhar limit
 Vikram Chandra (novelist), an Indian author
 Chandra Bahadur Dangi, the world's shortest person
 Chandra Ford, an American public health academic
 Chandra Levy, an American murder victim whose disappearance made national headlines in 2001
 Chandra Pasma, Canadian politician
 Chandra Prakash Gharti, Nepalese politician
 Chandra Shekhar, former (8th) Prime Minister of India
 Chandra West, a Canadian actress
 Chandra Wickramasinghe, an astronomer
 Chandra Wilson, an American actress
 Chandraprakash Dwivedi, an Indian film director and script writer

Astronomy 

 Chandra X-ray Observatory, a satellite launched by NASA in 1999, and named after Subrahmanyan Chandrasekhar
 1958 Chandra, an asteroid named after Subrahmanyan Chandrasekhar

History 

 Chandra dynasty
 Chandravanshi Kshatriya
 King Chandragupta Maurya, sometimes known as Chandra Gupta Maurya
 King Chandragupta I, sometimes known as Chandra Gupta I
 King Chandragupta II, sometimes known as Chandra Gupta II
 Chandradeva, 12th century Gahadavala king
 Chandar, king of Sindh and Buddhist ascetic

Geography 

 Chandra, Comoros, a village
 Chandra, Paschim Medinipur, a village in West Bengal, India
 Chandra Taal, a lake in the Himalayas

Entertainment 

 Chandra (film)
 Dr. Sivasubramanian Chandrasegarampillai, Dr. R. Chandra, a character in Arthur C. Clarke's Space Odyssey series
 Chandra Nalaar, a character in the card game Magic: The Gathering
 Dr. Chandra Suresh, a character in the American TV drama series Heroes
 Chandra, a song by a progressive rock band Snovi
Chandra, a character from the Disney Channel Original Movie Upside-Down Magic